Wood Islands Provincial Park is a provincial park in Prince Edward Island, Canada, situated immediately south of Wood Islands and  from Charlottetown, the provincial capital.

Location
It is located on the south-eastern coast of the island, on a peninsula that stretches into the Northumberland Strait, beside Prince Edward Island Highway 1 and the Wood Islands Ferry Terminal in Wood Island Harbour.

Amenities
The park is unsupervised with rest rooms and picnic facilities, and is officially open from mid June to mid September with no access control the rest of the year. It offers a large grassy area with views of the Northumberland Strait and the Wood Islands Harbour. From May into December the two Northumberland ferries from Nova Scotia come and go, with the interval as short as 90 minutes in the summer season. The Wood Islands Lighthouse is adjacent to the park and offers tours and nautical gifts.

See also
List of parks in Prince Edward Island

References

Provincial parks of Prince Edward Island
Parks in Queens County, Prince Edward Island